Nsoho is an administrative ward in the Mbeya Urban district of the Mbeya Region of Tanzania. In 2016 the Tanzania National Bureau of Statistics report there were 2,005 people in the ward, from 1,819 in 2012.

Neighborhoods 
The ward has 4 neighborhoods.
 Idunda
 Kilabuni
 Mbeya Peak
 Nsoho

References 

Wards of Mbeya Region